Minnesota State Highway 238 (MN 238) is a  highway in central Minnesota, which runs from its interchange with Interstate 94 and Stearns County State-Aid Highway 10 in Albany and continues north to its northern terminus at its intersection with State Highways 27 / 28 near Little Falls.

Route description
Highway 238 serves as a north–south route in central Minnesota between the cities of Albany and Little Falls.

Highway 238 changes direction to east–west in Upsala and continues as east–west for 8 miles before returning again to a north–south direction near Bowlus for the remainder of its route towards Little Falls.

The highway is officially marked as a north–south route by its highway shields from beginning to end.

In the city of Albany, Highway 238 follows 8th Street South, Railroad Avenue, and 1st Street. Railroad Avenue was the alignment of former U.S. Highway 52 until I-94 was constructed.

The route passes around the east side of North Lake in Albany.

Highway 238 is also known as Main Street in Upsala.

The route is legally defined as Route 238 in the Minnesota Statutes.

History
Highway 238 was authorized on July 1, 1949.

At the time it was marked, the highway was paved between Elmdale and Bowlus and a small section at its northern end. The segment between Upsala and the Morrison-Stearns county line was paved in 1953. In 1954 or 1955, it was paved from that point south to its terminus at then-U.S. 52. The final remaining segment north of Bowlus was paved in 1957.

Major intersections

References

External links

Highway 238 at the Unofficial Minnesota Highways Page

238
Transportation in Stearns County, Minnesota
Transportation in Morrison County, Minnesota